Ziyad Sabbagh (born 1960) is a Syrian politician who has been Minister of Industry since 2020.

Education and career

1986: Graduated from the Faculty of Science of Aleppo University and administrative information at the National Defense College.

2004-2013: General Manager of the General Industrial Company for Vegetable Oils in Aleppo Governorate

2005-2010: Member of the Board of Directors of Aleppo Industry Chamber

See also 

 First Hussein Arnous government
 Second Hussein Arnous government

References 

Living people
1960 births
21st-century Syrian politicians
Syrian ministers of industry
Arab Socialist Ba'ath Party – Syria Region politicians
Government ministers of Syria